Virus is a 2019 Indian Malayalam-language medical thriller film co-produced and directed by Aashiq Abu set against the backdrop of the 2018 Nipah virus outbreak in Kerala. The film was written by Muhsin Parari and Suhas-Sharfu. It stars an ensemble cast that includes Kunchacko Boban, Indrajith Sukumaran, Asif Ali, Tovino Thomas, Parvathy Thiruvothu, Rahman, Indrans, Jinu Joseph, Sreenath Bhasi, Dileesh Pothan, Rima Kallingal, Madonna Sebastian, Ramya Nambeeshan, Joju George, Soubin Shahir and Revathi.

Principal photography took place from January to February 2019 in a single schedule shot extensively in Government Medical College, Kozhikode and Government Homoeopathic Medical College, Kozhikode . The film was released worldwide on 7 June 2019, receiving critical acclaim and was a box office success. It was included in The Hindu's top 25 Malayalam films of the decade.

Plot

A man named Zakariya Mohammed is infected and brought to the Government Medical College, Kozhikode, where he suffers from the symptoms of an unknown virus and, after a few hours, dies. Geetha, who was taking Zakariya's CT scan, got infected by the virus. As nurses and doctors checked her blood pressure, the scale was going up and down which left the doctors there worried and confused. A nurse Akhila who treated Zakariya gets affected too. Slowly more cases are identified in the surrounding areas. Dr. Salim (a neurologist) while checking on Zakariya's father, Razak, notices symptoms related to poisoning and Japanese encephalitis and other such infections on Razak. Dr. Salim also asked Dr. Suresh Rajan to conduct a sample test for Nipah virus. The samples were collected from Suhana, sister of Zakariya.

As the death toll begins to rise, Dr. Suresh Babu confirms the unknown virus to be Nipah. Nipah spreads across Kozhikode and the neighbouring districts. Sister Akhila (the nurse who treated Zakariya), dies after a long battle with the virus and before she died, she wrote a letter to her husband. The film progresses with real life experiences of people who we are aware of when it has happened and also creates a backstory for each affected patient and generates an interest in the narration.

In an emergency situation, a team of medical practitioners and healthcare professionals, led by the Health Minister of Kerala C. K. Prameela and District Collector Paul V. Abraham IAS, camp in Kozhikode to tackle the crisis. There is an attempt made to justify that this is not a bio-weapon used by any country or organisation. While the film is ending, the film pays tribute to scientists, medical professionals, hospital staff, volunteers and the people who came forward to support the team to solve the virus attack. Health minister, C. K. Prameela announces Kozhikode Nipah virus free. In the end, it is shown that Zakariya saw a flying fox (a breed of bats) that was on the ground. He went there and before coming in contact with the bat, he took a picture of the bat for his Instagram story.

Cast
 
Kunchacko Boban as Dr. Suresh Rajan, Chief doctor
Indrajith Sukumaran as Dr. Baburaj
Asif Ali as Vishnu Bhaskaran
Tovino Thomas as Paul V Abraham IAS, district collector (Character based on Seeram Sambasiva Rao)
Parvathy Thiruvothu as Dr. Annu
Revathi as C. K. Prameela, Minister of Health & Social Welfare (Character based on K. K. Shailaja)
Poornima Indrajith as Dr. Smrithy Bhaskar, Director of Health Services
Rahman as Dr. Salim 
Rima Kallingal as Nurse Akhila (Character based on Sister Lini Puthussery) 
Sharaf U Dheen as Sandeep, husband of Akhila
Zakariya Mohammed as Zakariya, the first patient
Indrans as Razak, father of Zakariya
Savithri Sreedharan as Jameela, mother of Zakariya
Sreenath Bhasi as Dr. Abid Rahman
Jinu Joseph as  Dr. John Jacob, Dr Annu's husband
Srikant Murali as Dr. Moopan 
Senthil Krishna as Excise Minister CP Bhaskaran (Character based on T. P. Ramakrishnan) 
Joju George as Babu (Attender) 
Dileesh Pothan as  Prakashan, traffic police Constable 
Madonna Sebastian as Dr. Sara Yakub, a survivor and also Dr. Abid Rahman's lover
Remya Nambeeshan as Raji, Babu's wife
Basil Joseph as Dr. Mithu
Soubin Shahir as Unnikrishnan
Zeenath as Nurse Akhila's mother
Sudheesh as Radhakrishnan Health Inspector, Public health department 
Vettukili Prakash as Sadashivan (ambulance driver)
Sajitha Madathil as Dr. Sreedevi
Sarasa Balussery as Khadeeja
Binu Pappu as Dr.Sudevan
Nilambur Ayisha as Application Agent at Medical College
Darshana Rajendran as Anjali Vasudevan, Vishnu's Wife
Unnimaya Prasad as Dr. Nirmala
Lukman Avaran as Dr. Sajith
Haris Saleem as Dr. Haris
Leona Lishoy as Paul's Wife
Shebin Benson as Yahiya, Zakariya's brother
Kozhikode Jayaraj as Nasar, Zakariya's uncle
Sreedevi Unni as Dr. Abid's mother
Anjali as Suhana
Ann Saleem as Haifa
Divya Gopinath as Geetha, attender at Radiology dept.
Ambika Rao as Head nurse
Ramesh Kottayam as Medical College Superintendent 
Jolly Chirayath as Pradeep's mother
Sundar Pandyan as Grade 4 Cleaning Staff
Noushad Ali as Vipin
Dileesh Nair as Shanthan Vaidyar 
Neeraja Rajendran as Unnikrishnan's mother
Ajayan Adat as Vipin's friend
Vaisakh Shankar as Vaisakh Nair
Preethi Nambiar as Preethy Varma
Deepa Thomas as Junior Doctor
Abhilash Mohanan as himself (news reader)
Shani Prabhakaran as herself (news reader)
Vivek Varrier as House surgeon
Sidheeque N/ as Cameo Appearance (Cameraman)

Production
The film is based on the 2018 Nipah virus outbreak in Kerala. Principal photography began in Kozhikode on 6 January 2019, Kalidas Jayaram was supposed to appear in the film in a supporting but pivotal role, but was replaced by Sreenath Bhasi after the former did not ultimately accept it. Virus was shot extensively in and around Government Medical College, Kozhikode. Filming wrapped on 26 February 2019 after 52 days shoot in a single schedule.

Soundtrack

The original soundtrack is composed, programmed, and arranged by Sushin Shyam. The film features a promotional song titled "Spread Love" sung by Shelton Pinheiro, Madonna Sebastian, Muhsin Parari and Sushin Shyam, which was not included in the film, but was listed in the original soundtrack album, which features 17 instrumental numbers, which released on 17 May 2019.

Release
The film was released worldwide on 7 June 2019. The film dubbed in Tamil and Telugu as Virus and Nipah Virus released on Zee5 and Aha respectively.

Reception

Box office
The film grossed ₹3.9 crore in the opening weekend (7 – 9 June) from Kerala box office. It collected a worldwide total of over ₹15 crore in 12 days, with ₹11.74 crore from Kerala alone. By collecting $65,000 in 10 days from the United States, Virus became the fourth highest-grossing Malayalam film of 2019 in the US, behind Lucifer, Kumbalangi Nights, and Uyare. And as of 21 June, it is also the fourth highest-grossing Malayalam film of 2019 in the rest-of-India territories, behind Lucifer, Kumbalangi Nights, and Uyare. It earned ₹2,60,058 in Chennai from 18 shows in the opening weekend, and ₹4,82,715 in two weeks.

In the opening weekend, the film grossed $342,527 from the United Arab Emirates (UAE) and $9,098 from Australia. It grossed €2,749 (₹2.16 lakh) in Germany in two weeks. The film was released a week later (on 14 June) in the United Kingdom and New Zealand where it collected £14,991 (₹13.2 lakh) and NZ$12,409 (₹5.65 lakh) in the opening weekend, and £28,809 (₹25.56 lakh) and NZ$16,099 (₹7.4 lakh) in two weeks. In three weeks, it collected A$23,868 (₹11.56 lakh) in Australia and $587,960 in the UAE. In the US, it made $68,244 (47.13 lakh) in four weeks.

Critical reception
Sowmya Rajendran of The News Minute called the movie, "A compassionate, gripping medical thriller" and rated it 4/5 stars.

Meera Manu of News18 rated the movie 4/5 stars and said, "For its 152-minute duration, Virus will take you through many emotional roller-coasters. This one is contagious enough to make you skip a heartbeat or evoking tears. It's more than just a film, it's humans joining hands to beat a deadly disease. No reason to not watch this one." Manu of the Filmibeat rated the movie 4/5 stars and reviewed, "Virus is a mind-blowing movie and as its tagline says it rightly conveys the fear, fight and the survival during the Nipah outbreak. A well-crafted movie, which could be ranked as one among the best movies of all-time. Kudos to the team."

Anjana George of The Times of India rated the movie 3.5/5 stars and reviewed, "On the whole, the film can be called as a well-crafted multi-starrer, fictional documentation of news reports on the Nipah virus attack that shocked Kerala and still looms over us." Behindwoods rated the movie 3.25/5 stars and wrote, "With Virus, Aashiq Abu cements his top form as a filmmaker. Overall, Virus is a straightforward, detailed and uncompromising retelling of an unbelievable story of humanity."

Accolades

References

External links

2019 thriller drama films
2010s Malayalam-language films
Films scored by Sushin Shyam
Indian thriller drama films
Films shot in Kozhikode
Indian films based on actual events
Medical-themed films
Films about viral outbreaks
2019 drama films
Films directed by Aashiq Abu